Zhang Bin may refer to:

 Zhang Bin (Later Zhao) (died 323), official under Shi Le who founded Later Zhao
 Zhang Lingsheng (1863–?), born Zhang Bin, Chinese Christian missionary
 Benjamin Zhang Bin (born 1974), Chinese manhua artist

Sportspeople
 Zhang Bin (basketball) (born 1961), Chinese basketball player-coach
 Zhang Bin (pentathlete) (born 1969), Chinese pentathlete
 Zhang Bin (equestrian) (born 1973), Chinese equestrian
 Zhang Ying Bin, Paralympic athlete from China